{{DISPLAYTITLE:C16H12ClN3O3}}
The molecular formula C16H12ClN3O3 (molar mass: 329.738 g/mol, exact mass: 329.0567 u) may refer to:

 Meclonazepam
 Ro05-4082

Molecular formulas